Kimbell is a small township in New Zealand's Mackenzie District,  northwest of Fairlie. It is located on SH 8, not far from Burkes Pass, and is a  drive from Mount Dobson ski field. Kimbell was named after Frederick J. Kimbell, who purchased the nearby Three Springs farm in 1866.

Fairlie Peace Avenue 
Kimbell is the start of the Fairlie Peace Avenue. This is made up of 500 oak trees which were planted to commemorate the signing of the Treaty of Versailles, which ended World War I. Five trees were removed after being damaged by high winds during Easter 2021.  All of the trees (97%) were deemed to require some work in 2021. The priority was the removal of trees that had broken branches were unstable or had heavy dead wood that could fall on people or cars.

Notable buildings 

Kimbell is also home to the Silverstream Hotel, which was built in 1877, and is known as the 'new stone hotel'.

The former post office, Walnut Cottage, is a Historic Place Category 2 listed building. It is situated next to the Silverstream Hotel. It was built in 1878 from local limestone by T. Foden; stonemason F. Brehaut also was involved in its construction.

It is home to the Garage Gallery, an art gallery located in a former engineering garage.

References

Mackenzie District
Populated places in Canterbury, New Zealand